The Lockheed Explorer was the least successful wooden airplane design produced by the Lockheed Aircraft Company. The Vega fuselage was combined with a cantilevered low wing. Seating for a single pilot was provided in an open cockpit behind the wings.

Design and development

Work on the Explorer was commenced in 1927 for Sir Hubert Wilkins as an aircraft for use in exploration of Antarctica. However, this configuration was judged impractical, and Wilkins opted to use a Vega equipped with floats instead. The incomplete aircraft was brought out of storage to make an attempt at a nonstop flight between Japan and the United States, funded by lumber dealer John Buffelen and members of the Tacoma Chamber of Commerce. Named City of Tacoma, the first Pacific crossing attempt ended in disaster when overfilled fuel tanks spilled over on takeoff. Two subsequent attempts in newer Explorers also met with failure.

The wing of a wrecked Explorer was fitted to the fuselage of an Orion by aviator Wiley Post, resulting in an Orion-Explorer hybrid variously referred to as 'Wiley's Bastard' and 'Aurora', though Post himself referred to the aircraft only by its serial number. The aircraft, nose-heavy, crashed after its engine failed shortly after takeoff near Point Barrow, Alaska on August 15, 1935, taking the lives of Post and humorist Will Rogers.

Lockheed built a total of four Explorers, all of which were destroyed in crashes.

Variants 
4 Explorer Single-seat single-engined aircraft, powered by a 450-hp (336-kW) Pratt & Whitney Wasp radial piston engine. Built for a non-stop trans-Pacific flight between Japan and the united States; two built.
7 Explorer Improved version of the 4 Explorer, powered by a Pratt & Whitney Wasp C radial piston engine; two built.

Specifications (Explorer 4)

See also

References 

Notes

Bibliography
 Francillon, René J., Lockheed Aircraft since 1913. London:Putnam, 1982. .
 Francillon, René J, Lockheed Aircraft since 1913. Naval Institute Press: Annapolis, 1987.

Explorer
1920s United States civil utility aircraft
Single-engined tractor aircraft
Low-wing aircraft